Choonhavan is a surname. Notable people with the surname include:

Chatichai Choonhavan (1920–1998), Thai army officer, diplomat, and politician
Kraisak Choonhavan (1947–2020), Thai politician
Phin Choonhavan (1891–1973), Thai military leader and politician

Thai-language surnames